Roscommon Racecourse is a horse racing venue located in Roscommon, County Roscommon, Ireland, approximately 76 km north east of Galway and 136 km west of Dublin.

The course holds both flat and jump racing.  Racing unofficially commenced in 1837, with the first official contests occurring in 1885.  Apart from a 12-year hiatus between 1936 and 1948 racing has continued ever since.  The feature race of the year at Roscommon is the €40,000 2 mile Grade 3 Kilbegnet Novice Chase, run at the end of September. The 1994 renewal saw top 2 mile chaser Sound Man beat Shawiya with subsequent Cheltenham Gold Cup winner Imperial Call back in third. The 2018 renewal was also strong. It was won by Ornua who went on to win the Grade 1 Doom Bar Maghull Novices Chase at Aintree from Cadmium who went on to win the Topham Trophy over the National fences also at Aintree. The course's most prestigious flat race is the Lenebane Stakes. There are nine meetings per year, all between May and September, and are run on either a Monday or a Tuesday.

The course is right-handed of about 1 mile 2 furlongs in length with an incline on approach to the winning post.

There has been considerable investment in the last couple of years with an upgrade in facilities including stables, bars and entrance turnstiles. After the last meeting of 2018 the existing weighing room facility was demolished and replaced by a modern new building which will be formally opened on the first day of the new racing season in Roscommon on Monday May 13, 2019.

RECORDS:
Most successful horse (2 wins):

DOYOURWHACK – 2018, 2019

THREE BAR DICK 2014, 2016

THE MOTHERSHIP 2009, 2011
 
 

Leading jockey (4 wins):

Richard Hill – Mutamam (2000), Mubtaker (2003), Imperial Stride (2005), Laaheb (2010)

Longest winning distance: 

12 lengths - The Dromod Dirtbird

Notable races

References 

Horse racing venues in the Republic of Ireland
Sports venues in County Roscommon
Sports venues completed in 1837
Roscommon (town)